RPW may refer to:

Real Pro Wrestling
Regulative principle of worship
Revolution Pro Wrestling